Triangle Tech is a for-profit system of technical schools with multiple locations in Pennsylvania. It offers 16-month programs for an Associate in Specialized Technology Degree in various technologies. Triangle Tech was founded in Pittsburgh in 1944 and now has six locations across Pennsylvania, including Pittsburgh, Greensburg, DuBois, Sunbury, Chambersburg,  and Bethlehem. The school is licensed by the State Board of Private Licensed Schools and the Pennsylvania Department of Education and is accredited by the Accrediting Commission of Career Schools and Colleges.

External links

Universities and colleges in Erie County, Pennsylvania
Universities and colleges in Lehigh County, Pennsylvania
Universities and colleges in Northumberland County, Pennsylvania
Universities and colleges in Pittsburgh
Universities and colleges in Westmoreland County, Pennsylvania